Grafenrheinfeld is a municipality in the district of Schweinfurt in Bavaria, Germany. The municipality is home to the nuclear power station, Grafenrheinfeld, which opened in 1982.

Grafenrheinfeld Nuclear Power Station

The nuclear power station Grafenrheinfeld (short: KKG - not to confused with the similarly abbreviated nuclear power station Goesgen in Switzerland) is located south of Schweinfurt at the Main. Commencement of construction was 1974, start-up took place 1981. It consists of a 3rd Generation pressurized water reactor  ("pre-Konvoi") with an electrical output of 1345 MW. Operator is the E.ON nuclear power GmbH headquartered in Hanover. The two cooling towers with a height of 143 m are visible from far away. The nuclear power station was "power station world champion" in both years 1984 and 1985. In the much discussed anti-nuclear power novel Die Wolke by Gudrun Pausewang, a fictitious nuclear disaster occurs at Grafenrheinfeld, releasing a radioactive cloud which pollutes much of Germany. In the film of the same name, a fictitious plant name is used. Temporary storage facilities for depleted core fuel elements at the location went into use on 1 March 2006.

KFU-Mast

The KFU (nuclear reactor remote control, German Kernenergiefernüberwachung) mast Grafenrheinfeld is a guyed steel framework mast for the measurement of meteorological parameters and  environmental radioactivity. It is visible for a long distance and is outside of the plant area approximately 750 meters south the power station. The KFU-mast is 164 meters high and was built in 1977/78.

References

Schweinfurt (district)